Marguerite Leduc (born 31 October 1935) is a French alpine skier. She competed in two events at the 1960 Winter Olympics.

References

1935 births
Living people
French female alpine skiers
Olympic alpine skiers of France
Alpine skiers at the 1960 Winter Olympics
Sportspeople from Vosges (department)